Frédérique Quentin (born 22 December 1969 in Sibiville) is a retired French athlete who specialised in the middle-distance events. She represented her country at the 1996 Summer Olympics, as well as three World Championships, without qualifying to the final.

She is the national record holder in the mile run.

Competition record

Personal bests
Outdoor
800 metres – 2:02.28 (Frankfurt 1991)
1000 metres – 2:42.54 (Toulouse 1997)
1500 metres – 4:05.58 (Monaco 1999)
One mile – 4:27.43 (1996)
2000 metres – 5:51.15 (Nancy 1999)
Indoor'
800 metres – 2:09.41 (Frankfurt 1996)
1000 metres – 2:42.62 (Liévin 1994)
1500 metres – 4:12.31 (Stuttgart 1997)

French National Championships
French Champion in 1,500 m in 1992, 1995, 1996, 1997 and 1998.
French Champion Indoors in 1,500 m  in 1994, 1995, 1996, 1997 and 1998

References

1969 births
Living people
Sportspeople from Pas-de-Calais
French female middle-distance runners
Athletes (track and field) at the 1996 Summer Olympics
Olympic athletes of France
World Athletics Championships athletes for France
Mediterranean Games gold medalists for France
Mediterranean Games silver medalists for France
Mediterranean Games medalists in athletics
Athletes (track and field) at the 1991 Mediterranean Games
Athletes (track and field) at the 1993 Mediterranean Games
20th-century French women